Sword of God may refer to:

 Sword of God (novel), 2007 novel by Chris Kuzneski
 Sword of God (film), 2018 Polish film
 The Sword of God (album), a 2001 album by Quasi
 "The Sword of God" (novelette), a 1996 novelette by Russell Blackford

See also
Saifullah, an Arabic name meaning "sword of God"